Alfred Cornelius Lynch (26 January 1931 – 16 December 2003) was an English actor on stage, film and television.

Early life
Lynch was born in Whitechapel, London, the son of a plumber. After attending a Catholic school, he worked in a drawing office as a draughtsman before entering national service. Then, while working in a factory, he attended theatre acting evening classes, at which he met his life partner, James Culliford.

Stage
In 1958 he joined the Royal Court Theatre and acted in a number of plays, including original productions of Chicken Soup with Barley and The Kitchen by Arnold Wesker. Lynch also starred in Joan Littlewood’s production of Brendan Behan’s The Hostage in London and New York, in which critic Kenneth Tynan praised his "beautiful playing".

Screen work
After 1960 his career moved more into film and television, with leading roles in On the Fiddle (1961) and West 11 (1962) as well as prominent roles in Two and Two Make Six and The Password Is Courage (both 1962) and supporting roles in 55 Days at Peking (1963) and The Hill (1965).  He also appeared as Tranio in 1967's The Taming of the Shrew and as Medvedenko in the 1968 adaptation of The Sea Gull; while he later played Charlie Kray in the 1990 film The Krays.

On television he had the title role in the now-lost TV series Hereward the Wake (1965), as well as the lead in Manhunt (1969); along with a number of roles in one off plays, in series such as Theatre 625, The Wednesday Play and Armchair Theatre. He appeared in a number of popular television series in later years including Jackanory, Going Straight, Bergerac, Lovejoy, Pie in the Sky and the Doctor Who serial The Curse of Fenric as Commander Millington.

Death
After Culliford's stroke in 1972, Lynch moved from London to Saltdean, near Brighton, until his death from cancer in 2003.

Selected filmography

Notes

External links
 
 Obituary from The Guardian

1931 births
2003 deaths
20th-century English male actors
20th-century English LGBT people
21st-century English LGBT people
Deaths from cancer in England
English gay actors
English male film actors
English male television actors
Male actors from London
People from Whitechapel